John Tudor may refer to:

John Tudor (minister) (1930–2009), English Methodist minister
John Tudor (footballer) (born 1946), English former player for several teams, most notably Newcastle United
John Tudor (baseball) (born 1954), American former pitcher in Major League Baseball
John Tudor (cyclist) (born 1953), Welsh racing cyclist